David Keith Robin Gerrard  (born 15 June 1939) is an Anglican priest: he was the Archdeacon of Wandsworth from 1989 to 2004.
 
Gerrard was educated at the Royal Grammar School, Guildford and St Edmund Hall, Oxford. He held curacies at St Olave, Woodberry Down and St Mary, Primrose Hill followed by incumbencies at St Paul, Lorrimore Square then St Andrew and St Mark, Surbiton. He was Rural Dean of Kingston upon Thames from 1983 to 1988.

References

1939 births
People educated at Royal Grammar School, Guildford
Alumni of St Edmund Hall, Oxford
Archdeacons of Wandsworth
Living people